Demings is a surname. Notable people with the surname include:

Jerry Demings (born 1959), American law enforcement officer and politician, husband of Val
Val Demings (born 1957), American law enforcement officer and politician

See also
Deming (surname)
Demmings